Le repaire de la murène, written and drawn by Franquin, is the ninth album of the Spirou et Fantasio series, adding underwater adventure to the Spirou universe. After serial publication in Spirou magazine, it was released as a complete hardcover album in 1957.

Story
In The Moray's Keep, shipping magnate Xénophon Hamadryas offers a $6000 prize to the makers of a submarine innovation in order to find his sunken ship Le Discret off the French Mediterranean coast. The Count of Champignac's mini-sub invention is so spectacular that the competition must resort to sabotage. A chain of secrets need to be exposed while the maritime criminal John "the Moray" Helena lurks in the deep.

Background
The inventions of the Count of Champignac are central to this story as the X4 mushroom elixir that increases brain activity comes into play, resulting in the "Véhicule sous-marin individuel".

An old Fantasio invention, the "Fantacopter", makes a reappearance.

A new discovery in the biology of Marsupilami is revealed, as he demonstrates amphibious qualities.

References

 Franquin publications in Spirou BDoubliées

External links
 Spirou official site album index 
 Franquin site album index 

Comics by André Franquin
Spirou et Fantasio albums
1957 graphic novels
1957 in comics
Comics set in France
Mediterranean Sea in fiction
Works originally published in Spirou (magazine)
Literature first published in serial form